Qeshlaq-e Jeda (also Romanized as Qeshlāq-e Jedā; also known as Jedā Qeshlāqī (Persian: جداقشلاقي) and Jedā Qeshlāq) is a village in Angut-e Sharqi Rural District, Anguti District, Germi County, Ardabil Province, Iran. At the 2006 census, its population was 142, in 25 families.

References 

Towns and villages in Germi County